The bals des victimes, or victims' balls, were balls that were said to have been put on by dancing societies after the Reign of Terror. To be admitted to these societies and balls, one had to be a near relative of someone who had been guillotined during the Terror. The balls came to prominence after the death of Robespierre, supposedly first being held in early 1795 and first mentioned in popular writing in 1797. While anecdotal evidence attests to the balls' occurrence, and generations of French and non-French historians described them and accepted them as fact, some recent scholarship, citing a near-total lack of primary evidence, argues that they may have been fabrications based on rumor. Historian David Bell concludes: "The bals des victimes... never took place — they were an invention of early nineteenth-century Romantic authors."

Background
The bals des victimes allegedly began as part of a rash of merrymaking and balls that broke out as the Terror came to an end. According to one source, they emerged as an idea of youths whose parents and other near relatives had gone to the guillotine, and to whom the revolution had now restored their relatives' confiscated property. Reveling in the return of fortune they established aristocratic, decadent balls open to themselves alone.

Descriptions of the balls' particulars vary, but the common thread is that they were a cathartic device in which the participants acted out the emotional impact of their relatives' executions and the social upheavals occurring as a result of the revolution. Many who described the balls, often generations afterwards, nevertheless found them a scandalous idea. Whether real or imagined, the very idea of the balls reflected the post-Terror generations' morbid fascination with the horror of the guillotine and the excesses of the French Revolution with its mass executions.

Those who attended the orgiastic balls reportedly wore mourning clothes or elaborate costumes with crepe armbands signifying mourning. Some accounts have both men and women wearing plain but scanty dress in the wake of the impoverishment of the Revolution, at least until the return of their fortunes at which time ball dress became highly elaborate. Others describe women, in the fashion of Merveilleuses, dressing scandalously in Greco-Roman attire, with their feet bare, in sandals, or adorned only by ribbons, a possible allusion to the fact that women often went barefoot to the guillotine. The style of dress at such a ball was known by some as the "costume à la victime." Women, and by some accounts men too, wore a red ribbon or string around their necks at the point of a guillotine blade's impact. Both men and women attending the balls were said to have worn or cut their hair in a fashion that bared their necks in a manner reflecting the haircut given the victim by the executioner, women often using a comb known as a cadenette to achieve this fashion. According to some, this was the origin of the feminine hairstyle known as the "coiffure à la victime" or more popularly the "coiffure à la Titus", or (in England) "a la guillotine". Some sources state that a woman sporting this hairstyle sometimes wore a red shawl or throat ribbon even when not attending a bal des victimes.

In another macabre touch, instead of a graceful bow or bob of the head to one's dancing partner, a man who attended a bal des victimes would jerk his head sharply downwards in imitation of the moment of decapitation. Some sources suggest that women, too, adopted this salutation.

See also

Ci-devant
The French Revolution: A History
Hôtel Thellusson, where bals des victimes were organized
Incroyables and Merveilleuses
Jules Michelet
Thermidorian Reaction

References

 Joseph Clarke, Commemorating the Dead in Revolutionary France: Revolution and Remembrance, 1789-1799 (Cambridge: Cambridge University Press, 2007).
 Katell Le Bourhis, Age of Napoleon: Costume from Revolution to Empire, 1789-1815 (New York: Metropolitan Museum of Art, 1990).
 Aileen Ribeiro, Fashion in the French Revolution (New York: Holmes & Meier, 1988).

1795 events of the French Revolution
Balls in France